Lau Yew was a prominent member of the Malayan Communist Party. He was a high-ranking commander in its military arm during World War II, the Malayan Peoples Anti-Japanese Army.

After the war, he led the Malayan Peoples Anti British Army until his death in 1948. Lau Yew is believed to have favoured a seizure of power from the British in 1945 before they had fully re-established themselves in Malaya, but was opposed in this by the MCP's leader Lai Teck.

Lau Yew was killed in an ambush in Kajang by the Ferret Force teams on 16 July 1948.

Malaysian politicians
1948 deaths
Year of birth missing
Malaysian communists